Dana Beth Ardi is an American entrepreneur, venture capitalist, human capitalist, author, and contemporary art collector. Considered an expert in the field of talent management and organizational design, Ardi is the author of The Fall of the Alphas: The New Beta Way to Connect, Collaborate, Influence—and Lead. She is best known as a corporate anthropologist, which is a human capital practice she developed.

Early life and education 

Ardi spent her childhood in Manhattan, New York. She developed an interest in art at an early age, when her father, Jack Silverstein, owned a haberdashery that was greatly embraced by the art community. Ardi started taking courses at MoMA, a period where she joined a handful of museum groups and began to self educate herself. In 1967, after the 1966 Flood of the Arno River, Ardi traveled to Florence, Italy, where she volunteered as a mud angel, recovering and restoring damaged art throughout the city. Following her experience in Florence, she studied Renaissance art and art history at the University of Siena. Ardi earned a Bachelor of Science from the State University of New York at Buffalo, and a Master of Education and Doctorate from Boston College.

Career 

After receiving her PhD, Ardi began a career in special education, working in Boston and New York, and serving as an assistant professor of education at Fordham University's Graduate School of Education. In 1983, she was hired by McGraw-Hill Productions, which marked the start of Ardi's career in traditional and developing media. In 1994, Ardi was hired by R.R. Donnelly and Sons, where she led the company's new media initiatives, and, in 1995, she was appointed managing director, Partner, and Global Practice Leader at TMP Worldwide, an executive search firm.  At TMP, Ardi focused on human capital and organizational design. She left the company in 2000. Subsequently, she joined Jerry Colonna, Bob Greene and Fred Wilson at Flatiron Partners, a well-known early-stage venture capital fund, where she developed the now-standard practice of including the value of human capital into the overall determination of corporate worth. From 2000 through 2009, Ardi served as a partner and managing director at JPMorgan Partners/CCMP Capital, LLC, a private equity firm. Ardi left the company to found Corporate Anthropology Inc., a human capital and advisory firm which provides recruitment and organizational consulting to start ups, investors and corporate clients.

Involvement in contemporary art 

Ardi is a noted contemporary art collector and a mentor to contemporary artists and gallerists. Her personal collection includes works by Kelley Walker, Tracey Emin, Aaron Curry, Sarah VanDerBeek, Dana Schutz, Martha Rosler, Seth Price, Wolfgang Tillmans, Amy Sillman, Anne Collier, Josh Smith, Heimo Zobernig, Carter Mull, Sarah Crowner, William Wegman, and Andy Warhol. Ardi is a fellow of the Royal Society of the Arts, and is an officer on the Creative Arts Council of the Museum of Modern Art in New York.  Additionally, she is a member of the Leadership Council of the New York Foundation for the Arts.

Recognition 

Ardi, who wrote the column Ask Dr. Dana for The Industry Standard from 1998 - 2001, is a mentor for Springboard Enterprises, a "highly-vetted expert network of innovators, investors and influencers who are dedicated to building high-growth technology-oriented companies led by women." She has been a keynote and featured speaker at conferences and seminars worldwide, including events presented by The Wall Street Journal, Digital Hollywood, and the Harvard Business School.

Selected works 
 The Fall of the Alphas. October 2013. St. Martin's Press, New York.  (288 pp) Macmillan

References

External links 
 Corporate Anthropology Advisors
 Museum of Modern Art
 New York Foundation for the Arts
 Royal Society of the Arts
 Springboard Enterprises
 Women's Forum 

American women investors
American venture capitalists
American art collectors
Women art collectors
21st-century American women writers
21st-century American philanthropists
Year of birth missing (living people)
Living people
University at Buffalo alumni
Boston College alumni
JPMorgan Chase people
21st-century American businesswomen
21st-century American businesspeople
21st-century women philanthropists
American women philanthropists